Mukta or Muktha may refer to:

Entertainment
Mukta (1994 film) (मुक्ता), Marathi film directed by Jabbar Patel
Mukta (TV series) (ಮುಕ್ತ), Kannada-language TV series

People
T. Muktha also spelt Mukta (1914–2007), singer
Muktha (actress) (born 1991), Indian actress also known as Bhanu in the Tamil film industry
Muktha Srinivasan, Indian film director and producer
Muktha Ramaswamy, Indian film producer who worked in the Tamil film industry
Muktha S. Sundar, Indian film director and cinematographer who has worked on Tamil language films

Other
Mukta, village in Panki block

See also
Jivanmukta (from Sanskrit मोक्ष moksa, freedom) and paramukta, concepts in Hinduism